Engine House No. 7 may refer to:
Engine House No. 7 (Columbus, Ohio), on the Columbus Register of Historic Properties
Engine House No. 7 (Washington, D.C.)

See also
Engine House (disambiguation)